Hermann Müller may refer to:

 Hermann Müller (botanist) (1829–1883), German botanist with whom Darwin corresponded
 Hermann Müller (cyclist) (1911–?), German cyclist
 Hermann Müller (Thurgau) (1850–1927), Swiss botanist
 Hermann Müller (politician) (1876–1931), German Social Democratic politician and twice Chancellor of Germany
 Hermann Müller (athlete) (1885–1947), German race walker
 Hermann Müller (Idstein) (1935–2013), German politician, mayor of Idstein
 Hermann Joseph Muller (1890–1967), American geneticist and educator, Nobel laureate in Physiology and Medicine
 Paul Hermann Müller (1899–1965), Swiss chemist, Nobel laureate in Physiology and Medicine
 Hermann Paul Müller (1909–1975), German motorcycle and auto racer driver
 Herman Carl Mueller (1854–1941), German-born American ceramicist